Borate phosphates are mixed anion compounds containing separate borate and phosphate anions. They are distinct from the borophosphates where the borate is linked to a phosphate via a common oxygen atom. The borate phosphates have a higher ratio of cations to number of borates and phosphates, as compared to the borophosphates.

There are also organic esters of both borate and phosphate, e.g. NADH-borate.

Production 
In the high temperature method, ingredients are heated together at atmospheric pressure. Products are anhydrous, and production or borophosphates is likely.

The boron flux method involves dissolving ingredients such as an ammonium phosphate and metal carbonate in an excess of molten boric acid.

Use 
Borate phosphates are of research interest for their optical, electrooptical or magnetic properties.

List

References 

Borates
Phosphates
Mixed anion compounds